Ephemera guttulata, commonly known as the eastern green drake, is a species of mayfly in the genus Ephemera. The eastern green drake is native to the continental United States and Canada. Its conservation status per the NatureServe conservation status ranking system is G5, meaning it is secure.

Range 
This species is endemic to the eastern seaboard of the United States and Canada, ranging no further west than Ontario and Arkansas.

Reproductive cycle 
Like all mayflies, eastern green drakes have a fully aquatic larval stage. This is followed by a phase of a flying sexually immature adult called the subimago. Finally, there is a short-lived sexually mature adult stage (imago).

References 
 

Mayflies
Insects of the United States
Insects of Canada
Insects described in 1843
Taxa named by François Jules Pictet de la Rive